Scopula perlimbata is a moth of the family Geometridae. It is found in Colombia and Peru.

Subspecies
Scopula perlimbata perlimbata (Colombia)
Scopula perlimbata atridiscata (Warren, 1904) (Peru)

References

Moths described in 1874
perlimbata
Moths of South America